Framwellgate Moor is a village and civil parish in County Durham, England. It is situated to the north of Durham, and is adjacent to Pity Me and Newton Hall.  It has a population of 5,404, increasing to 6,112 at the 2011 census.

It is the location of New College Durham, the major further education establishment of the city. In addition, it is the location of Framwellgate School Durham which is a large and successful comprehensive school, science college and sixth form centre.

The civil parish is based on the village of Framwellgate Moor and also includes neighbouring Pity Me and Brasside.

Governance
An electoral ward with the same name exists. This ward includes Witton Gilbert and surrounding areas with a total population taken at the 2011 Census of 11,100.

Climate
Climate in this area has mild differences between highs and lows, and there is adequate rainfall year-round.  The Köppen Climate Classification subtype for this climate is "Cfb" (Marine West Coast Climate/Oceanic climate).

References

External links
Framwellgate School

Areas of Durham, England
Civil parishes in County Durham